Halobiforma haloterrestris is an extremely halophilic member of the Halobacteria and the type species of the genus Halobiforma. H. haloterrestris is aerobic and motile. The cells are red-pigmented, neutrophilic and show rod, coccus and slightly pleomorphic morphology.

References

Further reading

Rothschild, Lynn J., and Rocco L. Mancinelli. "Life in extreme environments."Nature 409.6823 (2001): 1092–1101.
Rehm, Bernd, ed. Microbial bionanotechnology: biological self-assembly systems and biopolymer-based nanostructures. Horizon Scientific Press, 2006.
Seckbach, Joseph, Aharon Oren, and Helga Stan-Lotter, eds.Polyextremophiles: life under multiple forms of stress. Vol. 27. Springer, 2013.
Stan-Lotter, Helga, and Sergiu Fendrihan. Adaption of microbial life to environmental extremes. Springer Wien, New York, 2012.
Bej, Asim K., Jackie Aislabie, and Ronald M. Atlas, eds. Polar microbiology: the ecology, biodiversity and bioremediation potential of microorganisms in extremely cold environments. CRC Press, 2009.

External links

LPSN
Type strain of Halobiforma haloterrestris at BacDive -  the Bacterial Diversity Metadatabase

Halobacteria
Archaea described in 2002